CFMA may refer to:

 Cajun French Music Association, an association dedicated to the promotion and preservation of Cajun music and culture
 CFMA-FM, a Canadian radio station
 Commodity Futures Modernization Act of 2000, United States federal legislation that officially ensured modernized regulation of financial products
 Changan Ford Mazda Automobile Co., Ltd. was an automotive manufacturing company headquartered in Chongqing, China and a joint venture between Changan Automobile, Ford Motor Company and Mazda.